Left for Dead is a 1989 album released by the group Crazy Horse.

For the last Crazy Horse studio album until the iTunes only release Trick Horse in 2009, Billy Talbot and Ralph Molina teamed up with singer/songwriter/guitarist Sonny Mone.

Made while Crazy Horse guitarist Frank "Poncho" Sampedro was otherwise engaged with Neil Young (having been the only member of Crazy Horse that Young did not fire from his late-eighties band The Bluenotes), Left For Dead was the first Crazy Horse album in 11 years and the album's title was a defiant statement of alienation felt by the other band members having been left behind. In 1990, Talbot and Molina would again reunite with Young and Sampedro for Ragged Glory.

Track listing
"Left for Dead" (Mone) – 4:19
"Child of War" (Mone) – 3:34
"You and I"  (Billy Talbot) – 2:45
"Mountain Man"	(Mone) – 3:06
"I Could Never Lose Your Love" (Mone) – 5:09
"In the Middle" (Jerry Conforti, Molina, Talbot) – 4:55
"If I Ever Do" (Mone) – 3:12
"World of Love" (Mone) – 4:30
"Show a Little Faith" (Mone) – 4:48

Personnel
Crazy Horse
 Billy Talbot - bass, keyboards, vocals
 Ralph Molina - drums, vocals
 Sonny Mone - lead vocals, guitar
 Matt Piucci - lead guitar, vocals
Additional personnel
 Dino Papanicolaou - Hammond organ, piano
 Jimmy Mitchell - engineer 
 Richard "Bonzo" Agron - production assistant
 Mark Humphreys - production assistant
 D. Hall - art direction

References

1989 albums
Crazy Horse (band) albums
Capitol Records albums